Minden Fenwick (18 December 1864 – 8 February 1938) was an English then later New Zealand tennis player active during the late 19th century and early 20th century. His best results in major tournaments came at the 1881 Wimbledon Championships where he reached the third round in the men' singles. Between 1881 and 1904 he contested 13 career singles finals, and won 5 titles.

Career
In 1881 Minden played his first event at the Darlington Association Tournament at Darlington, County Durham where he reached the quarter finals before losing to his brother Mark Fenwick. The same year he reached the semi-finals stage of the Northern Championships. In July 1881 he played at the 1881 Wimbledon Championships where he reached the third round stage, before he was beaten by George S. Murray Hill.

In 1882 he was a finalist at the Portland Park LTCC Tournament at Newcastle upon Tyne where he lost to E.A. Simpson, he also reached the finals of the Darlington Association Tournament where he was beaten by Arthur Wellesley Hallward. The same year he also took part in the prestigious Prince's Club Championships where he lost to Ireland's Peter Aungier in the secon round.

In 1883 he won his first notable title at the Derbyshire Championships held at Buxton where he defeated Robert Parsons Earwaker. The same year he reached the finals of the Northumberland Championships at Newcastle upon Tyne before losing his brother Mark Fenwick. In 1884 he was a losing finalist at two events that year, the first at Northumberland Cricket Club Lawn Tennis Tournament where he lost to E.M. Sinclair for the second time, and at the Northumberland County Club Tournament.

Around 1885 Minden emigrated to New Zealand with most members of his family. He did not play another event until 1886 when he took part in the Napier Tournament at Napier, New Zealand where he reached the final before losing to Eric Pollard Hudson. The same year he played at the Christchurch Tournament which he won defeating W.V. Millton in the final. In 1888 he took part in New Zealand Championships at where he reached the final, but lost to his brother Percival Clennell Fenwick. In 1889 he won the New Zealand Championships against Joy Marriott Marshall. In 1890 he failed to defend his New Zealand national title where he was Joy Marshall who avenged his previous years defeat.

In 1892 he entered for play at the New Zealand Championships where he reached the final for the third time, and won his second title against Richard Dacre Harman. In 1893 he retained his New Zealand national title for the third and last time. In 1904 he played his final singles event at the Ashburton tournament at Ashburton, New Zealand where he exited early in the first round. He retired from playing tennis thereafter.

Career Finals

Singles 13 (5 titles, 8 runners-up)

Work career
Minden later found employment as an electoral Returning officer at Mangateretere near Hastings, New Zealand,. he oversaw the Hawkes Bay petition against voting irregularities that occurred 24 February 1915. He retired thereafter.

References

External links
Official Player Profile: Wimbledon

1864 births
1938 deaths
19th-century male tennis players
British male tennis players
New Zealand male tennis players